Mahmoud Jan (born 1930) is a Pakistani middle-distance runner. He competed in the men's 800 metres at the 1956 Summer Olympics.

References

1930 births
Possibly living people
Athletes (track and field) at the 1956 Summer Olympics
Pakistani male middle-distance runners
Olympic athletes of Pakistan
Place of birth missing (living people)